Josep Lluís Franco Rabell (born 17 February 1954) is a Spanish activist and politician. He was candidate in the 2015 Catalan election for the Catalonia Yes We Can coalition, being MP between 2016 and 2018.

1954 births
Living people
Members of the 11th Parliament of Catalonia